Connemara, a division of Galway, was a UK Parliament constituency in Ireland, returning one Member of Parliament (MP) from 1885 to 1922.

Prior to the 1885 general election the area was part of the Galway County constituency. From 1922, on the establishment of the Irish Free State, it was not represented in the UK Parliament.

Boundaries
This constituency comprised the north-western part of County Galway, roughly corresponding to the region of Connemara. In 1918, with the abolition of the Galway borough constituency, the constituency was redrawn to include the town of Galway and exclude an area which had been transferred to County Mayo under the 1898 Local Government Act.

1885–1918: The baronies of Ballynahinch, Moycullen, and Ross.

1918–1922: The rural districts of Clifden and Oughterard, the district electoral divisions of Barna, Furbogh, Kilcummin, Killannin, Moycullen, Selerna, Slievenaneena, Spiddle and Tullokyne in the rural district of Galway, and the urban district of Galway.

Members of Parliament

Elections

Elections in the 1880s

Elections in the 1890s

Elections in the 1900s

Elections in the 1910s

References

Sources 

Westminster constituencies in County Galway (historic)
Dáil constituencies in the Republic of Ireland (historic)
Constituencies of the Parliament of the United Kingdom established in 1885
Constituencies of the Parliament of the United Kingdom disestablished in 1922